Eupithecia flavigutta is a moth in the family Geometridae first described by George Duryea Hulst in 1896. It is found in the United States in Colorado and montane forest areas in eastern Arizona and south-western New Mexico.

The wingspan is 16–20 mm. The forewings are dark, smoky violaceous with two ocherous, superimposed patches in the terminal
area.

References

Moths described in 1896
flavigutta
Moths of North America